St. Mary's Parish Hall is a historic sandstone building in the Mission District of Calgary.  It was built in 1905 to be used as a Roman Catholic parish hall, but starting in 1913 was adaptively reused as a railway station by the Canadian Northern Railway (CNoR), during which time it was known as Calgary Southwest Railway Station.  It was then operated as a railway station by the CNoR's successor, the Canadian National Railway (CN) until 1971.  In 1981 the building was named a Provincial Historic Resource of Alberta.  In 1985 a fire gutted most of the interior and it was restored in 1987.

Notes

Sandstone buildings in Canada
Community centres in Canada
Canadian Northern Railway stations in Alberta
Canadian National Railway stations in Alberta
Provincial Historic Resources of Alberta
Disused railway stations in Canada
Buildings and structures in Calgary
Catholic Church in Alberta
Burned buildings and structures in Canada
Railway stations in Canada opened in 1913
Historic buildings in Calgary
1905 establishments in Alberta